Thalapathi is the soundtrack album composed by Ilaiyaraaja, with lyrics written by Vaali, for 1991 Indian Tamil-language film of the same name which was written and directed by Mani Ratnam, and produced by G. Venkateswaran. The film stars Rajinikanth and Mammootty with Arvind Swamy in his feature-film debut, Jaishankar, Amrish Puri, Srividya, Bhanupriya, Shobana and Geetha in supporting roles. It was the last collaboration between Ilaiyaraaja, Vaali and Ratnam as the latter had associated with A. R. Rahman and Vairamuthu for all of his projects, beginning with Roja (1992), which marked Rahman's debut.

Development 
According to cinematographer Santosh Sivan, Ilaiyaraaja finished composing the entire soundtrack in "half a day". This is the first film for which Ratnam chose to use stereophonic music. The first song to be composed for the film was "Chinna Thayaval", although Ilaiyaraaja had given the tune of "Putham Puthu Poo" to Ratnam much earlier. "Chinna Thayaval" is set in Charukesi, a Carnatic raga, and "Putham Puthu Poo" is set in Hamsanandi. The recording of "Sundari Kannal", which is set in Kalyani, took place in Mumbai (then known as Bombay) with R. D. Burman's orchestra.The picturization of the song was heavily inspired from the book Ponniyin Selvan written by Kalki Krishnamurthy. This information was revealed by Mani Ratnam in his book "Conversation With Mani Ratnam" written by Baradwaj Rangan. "Rakkamma Kaiya Thattu" was conceived and composed to introduce the character Subbulaxmi onscreen. It is set in Abheri, and at the insistence of Ratnam, Vaali incorporated the devotional song "Kunitha Puruvamum" into this. "Yamunai Aatrile" is set in Yamunakalyani. The Bhogi-themed "Margazhithan" was inspired by Tamil folk music.

Track listing

Release history 
The original Tamil version of the soundtrack album features seven songs and was released on 23 April 1991. The Hindi-dubbed version Dalapathi has six songs, which were written by P. K. Mishra and released on Saregama. The Telugu-dubbed version, which was distributed by Aditya Music, features lyrics penned by Rajasri. Lahari Music released the Kannada-dubbed version of the film's soundtrack which was titled Nanna Dalapathi, and V. Nagendra Prasad penned its lyrics.

Reception 
N. Krishnaswamy of The Indian Express criticised the incorporation of "Kunitha Puruvamum" into "Rakkamma Kaiya Thattu", saying, "Beside this verse that has survived more than fourteen hundred years, how utterly pedestrian and absolutely base [Ilaiyaraaja's] song sounds. And how blasphemous and philistine it looks when the profound and the profane are juxtaposed with total disregard to cultural values". The album gets rave reviews 30 years later and soc media is aghast at boomer Kiccha's comment in Indian express on "Kunitha Puruvamum". The review board of Ananda Vikatan praised Ilaiyaraaja's music, particularly "Rakkamma Kaiya Thattu".

In popular culture 
The soundtrack was included in The Guardians list of "1000 Albums to Hear Before You Die". "Rakkamma Kaiya Thattu" was placed fourth among the songs listed in a BBC list of "World Top Ten Popular Songs of All-time". The song was included in the 2012 Hindi film Agent Vinod, and Lahari sued that film's producer Saif Ali Khan for using the song without permission. "Rakkamma Kaiya Thattu" was adapted in Hindi by Anand–Milind as "Tu Tu Tu Tu Tara" for Bol Radha Bol (1992). Rapper M.I.A. sampled the beats used in the chorus of "Kaattukuyilu" for her song "Bamboo Banga" from the album Kala (2007). "Yamunai Aatrile" was reused in '96 (2018); this version was sung by Chinmayi.

References

Bibliography 
 
 
 

1991 soundtrack albums
Ilaiyaraaja soundtracks
Tamil film soundtracks
Hindi film soundtracks